Ton Schulten (born 25 April 1938, Ootmarsum, Overijssel) is a Dutch painter who mainly paints landscapes using bright blocks of colour.

Schulten was one of six baker's children. He graduated from the Enschede Academy for Art and Industry in 1962 as a graphic designer and worked in advertising. In 1991 he was in a serious car accident on Tenerife, in which a friend was killed and he and his wife Ank Lammerink were put into a coma. After the accident his style changed and he began painting landscapes of the Twente area using initially primary colours and later also pastel shades. Ootmarsum houses Schulten's own gallery and a Ton Schulten museum, which opened in 1997. His work has great commercial success. He was knighted a member of the Order of Orange-Nassau in 2000. In 2004 the German art critic Hartmut Rau named his style of painting Concensism. In 2005 Schulten successfully sued an amateur painter for making works in his style.

Exhibitions
 Museum of Artlery, Atlanta, Santa Monica

References
Official Website
Ton Schulten 2005 Calendar, teNeues, 

1938 births
Living people
People from Ootmarsum
Dutch painters
Dutch male painters